The Ring magazine was established in 1922 and has since named a Fight of the Year, which this list covers.

Fights of the Year by decade

1920s
1922 Harry Greb W 15  Gene Tunney
1923 Jack Dempsey KO 2  Luis Firpo
1924 Gene Tunney KO 15  Georges Carpentier
1925 Harry Greb W 15  Mickey Walker
1926 Gene Tunney W 10  Jack Dempsey I
1927 Gene Tunney W 10  Jack Dempsey II
1928 Tommy Loughran W 15  Leo Lomski
1929 Max Schmeling KO 9  Johnny Risko

1930s
1930 Jackie Kid Berg W 10  Kid Chocolate I
1931 Max Schmeling KO 15  Young Stribling
1932 Tony Canzoneri W 15  Billy Petrolle II
1933 Max Baer KO 10  Max Schmeling
1934 Barney Ross W 15  Jimmy McLarnin I
1935 Joe Louis KO 4  Max Baer
1936 Max Schmeling KO 12  Joe Louis I
1937 Joe Louis W 15  Tommy Farr
1938 Henry Armstrong W 15  Lou Ambers I
1939 Joe Louis KO 11  Bob Pastor II

1940s
1940 Ceferino Garcia D 10  Henry Armstrong
1941 Joe Louis KO 13  Billy Conn I
1942 Willie Pep W 15  Chalky Wright I
1943 Beau Jack W 15  Bob Montgomery II
1944 Bob Montgomery W 15  Beau Jack III
1945 Rocky Graziano KO 10  Red Cochrane I
1946 Tony Zale KO 6  Rocky Graziano I
1947 Rocky Graziano KO 6  Tony Zale II
1948 Marcel Cerdan KO 12  Tony Zale
1949 Willie Pep W 15  Sandy Saddler II

1950s

1950 Jake LaMotta KO 15  Laurent Dauthuille II
1951 Jersey Joe Walcott KO 7  Ezzard Charles III
1952 Rocky Marciano KO 13   Jersey Joe Walcott I
1953 Rocky Marciano KO 11  Roland La Starza II
1954 Rocky Marciano KO 8  Ezzard Charles II
1955 Carmen Basilio KO 12  Tony DeMarco II
1956 Carmen Basilio KO 9  Johnny Saxton II
1957 Carmen Basilio W 15  Sugar Ray Robinson I
1958 Sugar Ray Robinson W 15  Carmen Basilio II
1959 Gene Fullmer KO 14  Carmen Basilio I

1960s
1960 Floyd Patterson KO 5  Ingemar Johansson II
1961 Joe Brown W 15  Dave Charnley II
1962 Joey Giardello W 10  Henry Hank II
1963 Cassius Clay (Muhammad Ali) W 10  Doug Jones
1964 Muhammad Ali KO 7  Sonny Liston I
1965 Floyd Patterson W 12  George Chuvalo
1966 José Torres W 15  Eddie Cotton
1967 Nino Benvenuti W 15  Emile Griffith I
1968 Dick Tiger W 10  Frank DePaula
1969 Joe Frazier KO 7  Jerry Quarry I

1970s

1970 Carlos Monzón KO 12  Nino Benvenuti I
1971 Joe Frazier W 15  Muhammad Ali I
1972 Bob Foster KO 14  Chris Finnegan
1973 George Foreman KO 2  Joe Frazier I
1974 Muhammad Ali KO 8  George Foreman
1975 Muhammad Ali TKO 14  Joe Frazier III
1976 George Foreman KO 5  Ron Lyle
1977 Jimmy Young W 12  George Foreman
1978 Leon Spinks W 15  Muhammad Ali I
1979 Danny Lopez KO 15  Mike Ayala

1980s
1980 Matthew Saad Muhammad KO 14  Yaqui Lopez II
1981 Sugar Ray Leonard KO 14  Thomas Hearns I 
1982 Bobby Chacon UD 15  Rafael Limon IV
1983 Bobby Chacon W 12  Cornelius Boza-Edwards II
1984 José Luis Ramírez KO 4  Edwin Rosario II
1985 Marvelous Marvin Hagler KO 3  Thomas Hearns 
1986 Stevie Cruz W 15  Barry McGuigan
1987 Sugar Ray Leonard W 12  Marvelous Marvin Hagler
1988 Tony Lopez W 12  Rocky Lockridge I
1989 Roberto Durán W 12  Iran Barkley

1990s
1990 Julio César Chávez TKO 12  Meldrick Taylor I
1991 Robert Quiroga W 12  Akeem Anifowoshe
1992 Riddick Bowe W 12  Evander Holyfield I 
1993 Michael Carbajal KO 7  Humberto González I
1994 Jorge Castro KO 9  John David Jackson I
1995 Saman Sorjaturong KO 7  Humberto González
1996 Evander Holyfield TKO 11  Mike Tyson I
1997 Arturo Gatti KO 5  Gabriel Ruelas
1998 Ivan Robinson W 10  Arturo Gatti I
1999 Paulie Ayala W 12  Johnny Tapia I

2000s

2000 Erik Morales W 12  Marco Antonio Barrera I
2001 Micky Ward W 10  Emanuel Augustus
2002 Micky Ward W 10  Arturo Gatti I
2003 Arturo Gatti W 10  Micky Ward III
2004 Marco Antonio Barrera W 12  Erik Morales III
2005 Diego Corrales KO 10  José Luis Castillo
2006 Somsak Sithchatchawal TKO 10  Mahyar Monshipour
2007 Israel Vázquez TKO 6  Rafael Márquez II
2008 Israel Vázquez W 12  Rafael Márquez III
2009 Juan Manuel Márquez KO 9  Juan Diaz I

2010s
2010 Giovani Segura KO 8  Ivan Calderon I
2011 Victor Ortiz W 12  Andre Berto I
2012 Juan Manuel Márquez KO 6  Manny Pacquiao IV
2013 Timothy Bradley W 12  Ruslan Provodnikov
2014 Lucas Matthysse KO 11  John Molina, Jr.
2015 Francisco Vargas TKO 9  Takashi Miura
2016 Francisco Vargas D 12  Orlando Salido
2017 Anthony Joshua TKO 11  Wladimir Klitschko
2018 Canelo Álvarez W 12  Gennady Golovkin II
2019 Naoya Inoue W 12  Nonito Donaire

2020s
2020 Jose Zepeda KO 5  Ivan Baranchyk
2021 Tyson Fury KO 11  Deontay Wilder III
2022 Leigh Wood TKO 12  Michael Conlan

See also

Ali–Frazier Award, an equivalent by the Boxing Writers Association of America

References

External links

 

Boxing awards
Fights of the year